Count  was a Japanese noble and statesman of the late Edo period and early Meiji period.

He was among the pro-Emperor sonnō jōi faction nobles who escaped to Chōshū Domain after members of the pro-shogunate kōbu gattai faction staged a coup in 1863. After the Meiji Restoration, he was appointed among the first , and served the fledgling government in early negotiations. After this he continued to hold important positions, including Governor of Kanagawa Prefecture, Chairman of the Hokkaido Development Commission, and Chamberlain, culminating in roles as Vice President of the House of Peers and Vice Chairman of the Privy Council. He was a count in the Japanese peerage. His art names included .

Life
Higashikuze was born on January 1, 1834, in Kyoto.

He served in the Imperial Court during his youth in the Bakumatsu period, participating in the sonnō jōi movement that advocated the overthrow of the shogunate and restoration of power to the emperor. However, on September 30, 1863, the pro-shōgun kōbu gattai faction took power in the court in a coup d'état. Protected by soldiers of Chōshū Domain, he escaped to Chōshū on a boat with six other court retainers. In 1864, he was moved from Chōshū to Dazaifu.

With the success of the Meiji Restoration in 1868, Higashikuze was rehabilitated. On January 17 of that year he became one of the first , a position later replaced by that of Minister of Foreign Affairs. In this role he presided over the first foreign relations incident of the new government, the Kobe incident, in which a misunderstanding between an Imperial army and two French sailors ballooned into an occupation of central Kobe by foreign troops. On March 19 he was appointed as Director-General of the Yokohama Court, a position which was renamed twice during the half year in which he held it, first to Director-General of the Kanagawa Court and then to Governor of Kanagawa Prefecture.

On August 25, 1869, Higashikuze was appointed as the second Chairman of the Hokkaido Development Commission. As the previous chairman, Nabeshima Naomasa, had resigned before beginning his work, it was Higashikuze who began the practical operation of the office. On September 21, he set out for Hokkaido on a ship from Shinagawa, accompanied by about 200 farmers and officials of the Development Commission. He arrived at his post in Hakodate on the 25th. That October, he was granted a fief of 1,000 koku as a reward for his service in the Restoration.

On October 15, 1871, he was appointed Chamberlain of Japan. In the same year he joined the Iwakura mission on its trip around the world, broadening his horizons.

In 1882, he served as Vice President of the Genrōin, and with the institution of the Kazoku peerage system in 1884, he was granted the title of count. The hereditary status of the Higashikuze family would ordinarily have placed him as a viscount, but Michitomi's own achievements in the Meiji Restoration led him to be awarded a higher rank. Only a few other exceptions were made in this way, including Sanjō Sanetomi and Iwakura Tomomi.

In 1888 he became a member of the Privy Council, in 1890 the Vice President of the House of Peers, and in 1892 the Vice President of the Privy Council.

Sources

People of the Boshin War
People of Meiji-period Japan
1834 births
1912 deaths
Governors of Kanagawa Prefecture